Commander-in-Chief, Land Forces (CINCLAND), was a senior officer in the British Army. CINCLAND commanded HQ Land Forces, an administrative apparatus that had responsibility for all of the army's fighting units in the United Kingdom (excluding Northern Ireland), Germany and Brunei, together with training garrisons in Nepal, Belize, Canada and Kenya. CINCLAND was also the Standing Joint Commander (UK) (SJC (UK)), with responsibility for the provision of Military Aid to the Civil Power within the United Kingdom. The position had existed since 1968, when it was known as General Officer Commanding Army Strategic Command. In 1972 it became Commander-in-Chief United Kingdom Land Forces (CINCUKLF). As from 1 April 2008, HQ Land Command was renamed HQ Land Forces (HQLF). Therefore, the Commander-in-Chief became Commander-in-Chief of HQ Land Forces.

CINCLAND headed the Commanders-in-Chief Committee, a body established for contingency planning purposes.

The post changed to a three-star position, Commander Land Forces, after 1 November 2011 following a major army command reorganisation. In November 2015, the post of Commander Land Forces was redesignated as Commander Field Army.

Post holders
Holders of the post have been:

See also
 Commander-in-Chief Fleet
 Commander-in-Chief of Air Command

References

Senior appointments of the British Army
Commanders in chief